Colwich is a civil parish in the Borough of Stafford, Staffordshire, England. It contains 73 listed buildings that are recorded in the National Heritage List for England. Of these, seven are listed at Grade I, the highest of the three grades, ten are at Grade II*, the middle grade, and the others are at Grade II, the lowest grade.  The parish includes the villages of Colwich, Great Haywood, and Little Haywood, and the surrounding area.  The most important building in the parish is Shugborough Hall, a large country house, which is listed together with associated structures and buildings in the grounds.  The Trent and Mersey Canal passes through the parish, and joins the Staffordshire and Worcestershire Canal at Haywood Junction, and buildings associated with these canals include bridges, locks, mileposts, and a canal cottage and privy.  The other listed buildings include churches, houses and associated structures, farmhouses, farm buildings, a public house, road and railway bridges, and a school.


Key

Buildings

References

Citations

Sources

Lists of listed buildings in Staffordshire